In enzymology, a mannuronate reductase is an enzyme that catalyzes the chemical reaction

D-mannonate + NAD(P)+  D-mannuronate + NAD(P)H + H+

The 3 substrates of this enzyme are D-mannonate, NAD+, and NADP+, whereas its 4 products are D-mannuronate, NADH, NADPH, and H+.

This enzyme belongs to the family of oxidoreductases, specifically those acting on the CH-OH group of donor with NAD+ or NADP+ as acceptor.  The systematic name of this enzyme class is D-mannonate:NAD(P)+ 6-oxidoreductase. Other names in common use include mannonate dehydrogenase, mannonate (nicotinamide adenine dinucleotide, (phosphate))dehydrogenase, mannonate dehydrogenase, mannuronate reductase, mannonate dehydrogenase (NAD(P)+), D-mannonate:nicotinamide adenine dinucleotide (phosphate, and oxidoreductase (D-mannuronate-forming)).

References 

 

EC 1.1.1
NADPH-dependent enzymes
NADH-dependent enzymes
Enzymes of unknown structure